The Chesapeake Group is a geologic group in Maryland, Virginia, Delaware, and North Carolina. It preserves mainly marine fossils dating back to the Miocene and Pliocene epochs of the Neogene period. This group contains one of the best studied fossil record of Neogene oceans in the world. Professional Paleontologists and amateur fossil hunters alike collect from this group intensely. The Calvert Cliffs stretch the length of Calvert County, Maryland and provide the best continuous stretch of the Calvert, Choptank, and St. Marys Formations. Ward (1985) recommended including the Old Church Formation in this group.

See also

 List of fossiliferous stratigraphic units in North Carolina
 List of fossiliferous stratigraphic units in Maryland
 List of fossiliferous stratigraphic units in Delaware
 List of fossiliferous stratigraphic units in Virginia

References

 

Geologic groups of North Carolina